Patrick Cooper (born 1968) is a winter Paralympian from New Zealand who competed in the Paralympic Winter Games in 1988, 1992 and 1994 in the para alpine skiing.

Career 
Cooper made his first appearance at the Winter Games in Innsbruck 1988. He competed in the Men's Slalom LW4 event where he won a silver medal.

In his second Winter Game, the Albertville 1992 Paralympic Winter Games, he won 2 gold medals for New Zealand from the Men's Slalom LW4 and Super-G LW4 event.

In Lillehammer 1994 Paralympic Winter Games, Cooper managed to grab 3 medals for his country, gold in Men's Slalom LW4 and Men's Super-G LW4 and a bronze medal in the Men's Giant Slalom LW4 event.

References

External links 
 
 

1968 births
Living people
New Zealand male skiers
Paralympic alpine skiers of New Zealand
Paralympic gold medalists for New Zealand
Paralympic silver medalists for New Zealand
Paralympic bronze medalists for New Zealand
Paralympic medalists in alpine skiing
Alpine skiers at the 1988 Winter Paralympics
Alpine skiers at the 1992 Winter Paralympics
Alpine skiers at the 1994 Winter Paralympics
Medalists at the 1988 Winter Paralympics
Medalists at the 1992 Winter Paralympics
Medalists at the 1994 Winter Paralympics
Date of birth missing (living people)